The Cabourg Film Festival ( or simply ) is an annual film festival held every June in Cabourg, France. Founded in 1983 by writer-journalist Gonzague Saint Bris, the festival is dedicated to films in the romantic genre and films with elements of romanticism.

Awards

Competition
 Feature film
 Grand Prix
 Short film
 Best Short Film
 Best Director
 Best Actress
 Best Actor

Panorama
 Audience Award (Prix du Public)

Premiers Rendez-vous
 Prix Premier Rendez-Vous

Jeunesse 
 Youth Jury Prize (Prix de la Jeunesse)

Ciné Swann 
 Best Feature Film (Swann d'Or du meilleur long-métrage)
 Best Director (Swann d'Or du meilleur réalisateur de long-métrage)
 Best Actress (Swann d'Or de la meilleure actrice)
 Best Actor (Swann d'Or du meilleur acteur)
 Female Revelation (Swann d'Or de la Révélation féminine)
 Male Revelation (Swann d'Or de la Révélation masculine)
 Coup de Cœur

2000 edition

Feature film
Jury President: Raúl Ruiz

Swann d'Or 
 Best Feature Film: Fidelity (La Fidélité)
 Best Actress: Sophie Marceau – Fidelity (La Fidélité)
 Best Actor: Jean-Pierre Bacri – The Taste of Others (Le Goût des Autres)
 Female Revelation: Marion Cotillard – Blue Away to America (Du Bleu jusqu'en Amérique)
 Male Revelation: Sami Bouajila – The Adventures of Felix (Drôle de Félix)
 Coup de Foudre: Bernard Giraudeau

Short film
 Best Short Film: Les Aveugles
 Best Actress: Nathalie Villeneuve – Carpe Diem
 Best Actor: Gilberto Azevedo – Des morceaux de ma femme

2001 edition

Feature film
Jury President: Claude Pinoteau

 Grand Prix: Malèna directed by Giuseppe Tornatore
 Special mention: Why Get Married the Day the World Ends? (Pourquoi se marier le jour de la fin du Monde ?) directed by Harry Cleven

Swann d'Or 
 Best Director: Jean-Pierre Jeunet – Amélie (Le Fabuleux destin d'Amélie Poulain)
 Best Actress: Sandrine Bonnaire – Mademoiselle
 Best Actor: Mathieu Kassovitz – Amélie (Le Fabuleux destin d'Amélie Poulain)
 Female Revelation: Émilie Dequenne – Brotherhood of the Wolf (Le Pacte des Loups)
 Male Revelation: Éric Caravaca – Unleaded (Sans Plomb)
 Coup de Cœur: Arielle Dombasle
 Coup de Foudre: Richard Berry

Short film
 Best Short Film: Jean-Fares
 Best Actress: Alice Carel – On s'embrasse ?
 Best Actor: Jean-Luc Abel – On s'embrasse ?

2002 edition

Feature film
Jury: Nina Companéez (President), Évelyne Bouix, Marie Nimier

 Grand Prix: Riding in Cars with Boys directed by Penny Marshall
 Special mention: Irène directed by Yvan Calberac

Swann d'Or 
 Best Director: Yvan Attal – My Wife Is an Actress (Ma femme est une actrice)
 Best Actress: Mathilde Seigner – The Girl from Paris (Une hirondelle a fait le printemps)
 Best Actor: Sergi López – Women or Children First (Les Femmes... ou les enfants d'abord...)
 Female Revelation: Mélanie Doutey – The Warrior's Brother (Le Frère du guerrier)
 Male Revelation: Bernard Campan – Beautiful Memories (Se souvenir des belles choses)
 Coup de Cœur: Mylène Demongeot

Short film
 Best Short Film: J'attendrai le suivant
 Best Actress: Dinara Droukarova – Pensée assise
 Best Actor: Thomas Gaudin – J'attendrai le suivant

2003 edition

Feature film
Jury: Antoine de Caunes (President), Sacha Bourdo, Bruno Chiche, Vincent Delerm, Marie Gillain, Vincent Lannoo, Stanislas Merhar

 Grand Prix: Life Kills Me (Vivre me tue) directed by Jean-Pierre Sinapi

Swann d'Or 
 Best Director: Jean-Paul Rappeneau – Bon Voyage
 Best Actress: Isabelle Adjani – Adolphe
 Best Actor: Bernard Giraudeau – That Day (Ce Jour-Là)
 Female Revelation: Morgane Moré – Once Upon an Angel (Peau d'Ange)
 Male Revelation: Jalil Lespert – Life Kills Me (Vivre me tue)
 Coup de Cœur: Isabelle Adjani

Short film
 Best Short Film: L'Escalier
 Best Actress: Nina Meurisse – L'Escalier
 Best Actor: Moussa Maaskri – Quand le vent tisse les fleurs

2004 edition

Feature film
 Grand Prix: The Consequences of Love directed by Paolo Sorrentino

Swann d'Or 
 Best Director: Abdellatif Kechiche – Games of Love and Chance (L'Esquive)
 Best Actress: Karin Viard – France Boutique
 Best Actor: Patrick Bruel – Une vie à t'attendre
 Female Revelation: Sara Forestier – Games of Love and Chance (L'Esquive)
 Male Revelation: Nicolas Duvauche – Eager Bodies (Les Corps impatients)
 Coup de Cœur: Josiane Balasko

Short film
 Best Short Film: Cousines
 Best Actress: Marie-Laure Descoureaux – Hymne à la gazelle
 Best Actor: Adrien de Van – Trois jeunes tambours

2005 edition

Feature film
 Grand Prix: My Summer of Love directed by Paweł Pawlikowski

Swann d'Or 
 Best Director: Arnaud Desplechin – Kings and Queen (Rois et Reine)
 Best Actress: Valeria Bruni Tedeschi – 5x2 & Crustacés et Coquillages
 Best Actor: Vincent Lindon – La Moustache
 Female Revelation: Lola Naymark – A Common Thread (Brodeuses)
 Male Revelation: Nicolas Cazalé – Le Grand Voyage
 Coup de Cœur: Charlotte Rampling

Short film
 Best Short Film: Pépins Noirs
 Best Actress: Thérèse Roussel – Le Temps des cerises
 Best Actor: Fred Epaud – Libre échange
 Prix Cinecourts: After Shave directed by Hany Tamba

Jeunesse 
 Youth Jury Prize: My Summer of Love directed by Paweł Pawlikowski

2006 edition

Feature film
Jury: Xavier Beauvois, Soledad Bravi, Catherine Jacob, Julie Lopes-Curval, Caterina Murino, Brigitte Roüan, Pascale Roze

 Grand Prix: Lower City directed by Sérgio Machado
 Special mention: Quinceañera directed by Richard Glatzer and Wash Westmoreland

Swann d'Or 
 Best Director: Michele Placido – Romanzo Criminale (Rois et Reine)
 Best Actress: Cécile de France – Avenue Montaigne (Fauteuils d'orchestre)
 Best Actor: Michel Blanc – You Are So Beautiful (Je vous trouve très beau)
 Female Revelation: Anna Mouglalis – Romanzo Criminale
 Male Revelation: Lorànt Deutsch – Les Amants du Flore

Short film
 Best Director: Maryline Canto – Fais de beaux rêves
 Best Actress: Thérèse Roussel – Béa
 Best Actor: Aymeric Cormerais – Béa
 Special mention:  Des putes dans les arbres
 Prix Cinecourts: La Petite Flamme directed by Elizabeth Marre and Olivier Pont

Jeunesse 
 Youth Jury Prize: Lower City directed by Sérgio Machado
 Special mention: The Yacoubian Building directed by Marwan Hamed

2007 edition

Feature film
Jury: Andrzej Żuławski (President), Anne Consigny, Agnès de Sacy, Yves Marmion, Roxane Mesquida, Sagamore Stévenin, Colo Tavernier

 Grand Prix: Franz + Polina directed by Mikhail Segal

Swann d'Or 
 Best Director: Christophe Honoré – Love Songs (Les Chansons d'amour)
 Best Actress: Marion Cotillard – La Vie en Rose (La Môme)
 Best Actor: Guillaume Canet – Hunting and Gathering (Ensemble, c'est tout)
 Female Revelation: Clémence Poésy – Le Grand Meaulnes
 Male Revelation: Fu'ad Aït Aattou – The Last Mistress (Une vieille maîtresse)

Short film
 Best Director: Alice Winocour – Magic Paris
 Best Actress: Johanna ter Steege – Magic Paris
 Best Actor: Jonathan Zaccaï – De l'Amour

Jeunesse 
 Youth Jury Prize: Water Lilies (Naissance des Pieuvres) directed by Céline Sciamma

2008 edition

Feature film
Jury: Jean-Pierre Denis (President), Lolita Chammah, Emmanuelle Cosso-Mérad, Hafsia Herzi, Maïwenn, Anne Le Ny, Jean-François Lepetit, Claire Nebout, Clément Sibony, Erick Zonca

 Grand Prix: Alice's House (A Casa de Alice) directed by Chico Teixeira

Swann d'Or 
 Best Director: Emmanuel Mouret – Shall We Kiss? (Un baiser s'il vous plaît)
 Best Actress: Laetitia Casta – Born in 68 (Nés en 68)
 Best Actor: Patrick Bruel – A Secret (Un secret)
 Female Revelation: Anne Marivin – Welcome to the Sticks (Bienvenue chez les Ch'tis)
 Male Revelation: Yannick Renier – Born in 68 (Nés en 68)

Short film
 Best Director: Samuel Tilman – Voix de garage
 Best Actress: Julie Gayet – S'éloigner du rivage
 Best Actor: Dominique Wittorski – 6ème Ciel

Jeunesse 
 Youth Jury Prize: Cherry Blossoms directed by Doris Dörrie

2009 edition

Feature film
Jury: Sam Karmann (President), Marie-Anne Chazel, Mélanie Doutey, Julie Gayet, François Kraus, Vahina Giocante, Jacques Fieschi, Jérôme Bonnell, Nicolas Giraud

 Grand Prix (ex-æquo):
 Somers Town directed by Shane Meadows
 Sometime in August directed by Sebastian Schipper

Swann d'Or 
 Best Director: Stephen Frears – Chéri
 Best Actress: Émilie Dequenne – The Girl on the Train (La Fille du RER)
 Best Actor: Benoît Poelvoorde – Coco Before Chanel (Coco avant Chanel)
 Female Revelation: Anaïs Demoustier – Les Grandes Personnes
 Male Revelation: Jérémy Kapone – LOL (Laughing Out Loud)

Short film
Jury: Robin Renucci (President), Jeanne Cherhal, Cécile Cassel, Bouraouia Marzouk, Francois Vincentelli, Nicolas Rollinger

 Best Director: Rúnar Rúnarsson – Two Birds
 Best Actress: Camille Claris – En Douce
 Best Actor: Nazmi Kirik – Sidewalk

Jeunesse 
 Youth Jury Prize: Somers Town directed by Shane Meadows

Panorama
 Audience Award: Tengri: Blue Heavens directed by Marie-Jaoul de Poncheville

Premiers Rendez-vous
 Prix Premiers Rendez-vous:
 Firat Ayverdi – Welcome
 Àstrid Bergès-Frisbey – The Sea Wall (Un Barrage contre le Pacifique)

2010 edition

Feature film
 Grand Prix (ex-æquo):
 Air Doll directed by Hirokazu Koreeda
 Come Undone (Cosa voglio di più) directed by Silvio Soldini

Swann d'Or 
 Best Romantic Comedy: Heartbreaker (L'Arnacœur)
 Best Director: Julie Delpy – The Countess (La Comtesse)
 Best Actress: Marina Hands – Ensemble, nous allons vivre une très très grande histoire d'amour
 Best Actor: Éric Elmosnino – Gainsbourg: A Heroic Life (Gainsbourg (Vie héroïque))
 Female Revelation: Leïla Bekhti – Tout ce qui brille
 Male Revelation: Vincent Rottiers – Silent Voice (Qu'un seul tienne et les autres suivront)
 Coup de Cœur:
 Christophe Lambert – Trivial (La Disparue de Deauville), Cartagena (L'Homme de chevet) and White Material
 Coup de Foudre: Mammuth directed by Gustave Kervern and Benoît Delépine

Short film
 Best Director: Amal Kateb – On ne mourra pas
 Special mention: Vincent Vizioz – Tremblay-en-France
 Best Actress: Yelle – Une pute et un poussin
 Best Actor: Joseph Malerba – Le Cygne

Jeunesse 
 Youth Jury Prize: Me Too (Yo, también) directed by Antonio Naharro and Álvaro Pastor

Panorama
 Audience Award: The Names of Love (Le Nom des gens) directed by Michel Leclerc

Premiers Rendez-vous
 Prix Premiers Rendez-vous:
 Alice de Lencquesaing – Father of My Children (Le Père de mes enfants)
 Mehdi Dehbi – He Is My Girl (La Folle Histoire d'amour de Simon Eskenazy )

2011 edition

Feature film
Jury: Radu Mihăileanu (President), Àstrid Bergès-Frisbey, Audrey Dana, Virginie Despentes, Emmanuel Mouret, Tomer Sisley, Saïd Taghmaoui

 Grand Prix: Declaration of War (La Guerre est déclarée) directed by Valérie Donzelli
 Special mention: Happy, Happy directed by Anne Sewitsky

Swann d'Or 
 Best Romantic Film: Les Yeux de sa mère directed by Thierry Klifa
 Best Director: Patrice Leconte – Voir la mer
 Best Actress: Isabelle Carré  – Romantics Anonymous (Les Émotifs anonymes)
 Best Actor: Jean Dujardin – A View of Love (Un balcon sur la mer)
 Female Revelation: Pauline Lefèvre – Voir la mer
 Male Revelation: Raphaël Personnaz – The Princess of Montpensier (La Princesse de Montpensier )
 Coup de Cœur: Sylvie Vartan
 Coup de Foudre: Si tu meurs, je te tue directed by Huner Saleem

Short film
Jury: Gustave Kervern (President), Déborah François, Isabelle Frilley, Michèle Simmonet, Vénus Khoury-Ghata, Heremoana Maamaatuaiahutapu
 Best Short Film: J'aurais pu être une pute  directed by Baya Kasmi
 Special mention: Prochainement sur vos écrans directed by Fabrice Maruca
 Best Actress: Vimala Pons – J'aurais pu être une pute
 Best Actor: Franc Bruneau – Cheveu

Jeunesse 
 Youth Jury Prize: Barney's Version directed by Richard J. Lewis

Panorama
 Audience Award: Where Do We Go Now? (Et maintenant, on va où ?) directed by Nadine Labaki

Premiers Rendez-vous
 Prix Premiers Rendez-vous:
 Ana Girardot – Lights Out (Simon Werner a disparu...)
 Jérémie Duvall – Jo's Boy (Le Fils à Jo) & Mon père est femme de ménage

2012 edition

Feature film
Jury: Yann Samuell (President), Bertrand Burgalat, Pierre Aïm, Thomas Anargyros, Amira Casar, Mathieu Demy, Marie Denarnaud, Anne Marivin, Christa Theret
 Grand Prix: Laurence Anyways directed by Xavier Dolan

Swann d'Or 
 Best Film: Rust and Bone (De rouille et d'os) directed by Jacques Audiard
 Best Director: Robert Guédiguian – The Snows of Kilimanjaro (Les Neiges du Kilimandjaro)
 Best Actress: Léa Seydoux – Farewell, My Queen (Les Adieux à la reine) & Sister (L'Enfant d'en haut)
 Best Actor: Jérémie Rénier – My Way (Cloclo)
 Best Composer: Alex Beaupain
 Female Revelation: Soko – Bye Bye Blondie
 Male Revelation: Pierre Niney – 18 Years Old and Rising (J'aime regarder les filles
 Coup de Cœur: Corinne Masiero – Louise Wimmer
 Swann d'honneur: Vanessa Paradis

Short film
Jury: Pascal Greggory (President), Anne Azoulay, Natacha Régnier, Niels Schneider, Sarah Stern

 Best Short Film: Les Navets blancs empêchent de dormir directed by Rachel Lang
 Best Actress: Sophia Leboutte – A New Old Story
 Best Actor: Sébastien Houbani – La Tête froide

Jeunesse 
 Youth Jury Prize: Laurence Anyways directed by Xavier Dolan

Panorama
 Audience Award: My Lucky Star (Ma bonne étoile) directed by Anne Fassio

Premiers Rendez-vous
 Prix Premiers Rendez-vous:
 Abraham Belaga – A Bottle in the Gaza Sea (Une bouteille à la mer)
 Fleur Lise – My Lucky Star (Ma bonne étoile)

2013 edition

Feature film
 Grand Prix: Grand Central directed by Rebecca Zlotowski

Swann d'Or 
 Best Film:  (Le Temps de l'aventure) directed by Jérôme Bonnell
 Best Actress: Emmanuelle Devos –  (Le Temps de l'aventure)
 Best Actor: Pierre Niney – It Boy (20 ans d'écart)
 Female Revelation: Lola Créton – Something in the Air (Après mai)
 Male Revelation: Félix Moati – Télé gaucho
 Coup de Cœur: Catherine Deneuve – On My Way (Elle s'en va)

Short film
 Best Short Film: On the Beach directed by Marie-Elsa Sgualdo
 Best Actress: Joanne Nussbaum – On the Beach Best Actor: Olivier Duval – L'Amour bègueJeunesse 
 Youth Jury Prize: My Sweet Pepper Land directed by Huner Saleem

Panorama
 Audience Award: Queens of the Ring (Les Reines du ring) directed by Jean-Marc Rudnicki

Premiers Rendez-vous
 Prix Premiers Rendez-vous:
 Victoire Belezy – Fanny François Civi – Macadam Baby2014 edition

Feature film
Jury: Catherine Corsini (Co-President), Martin Provost (Co-President), Pauline Étienne, Gilles Henry, Jean-Louis Martinelli, Gilbert Melki, Natacha Régnier, Laura Smet, Anne-Dominique Toussaint

 Grand Prix (ex-æquo):
 Party Girl directed by Marie Amachoukeli, Claire Burger, Samuel Theis
 Matterhorn directed by Diederik Ebbinge

Swann d'Or 
 Best Film: Not My Type (Pas son genre) directed by Lucas Belvaux
 Best Director: Pierre Salvadori – In the Courtyard (Dans la cour)
 Best Actress: Émilie Dequenne – Not My Type (Pas son genre)
 Best Actor: Loïc Corbery – Not My Type (Pas son genre)
 Female Revelation: Alice Isaaz – Les Yeux jaunes des crocodiles Male Revelation: Pierre Rochefort – Going Away (Un beau dimanche)
 Coup de Cœur: Zhang Ziyi

Short film
Jury: Guillaume Nicloux (President), Victoire Bélézy, Pascal Bourdiaux, Florence Loiret Caille, China Moses, Stéphanie Murat, Julien Poupard

 Best Short Film: Bruine directed by Dénes Nagy
 Best Cinematographer: Fiona Braillon – Solo Rex Best Actress: Liv Henneguier – Loups solitaires en mode passif Best Actor (ex-æquo): Wim Willaert & Lucas Moreau – Solo RexJeunesse 
 Youth Jury Prize: Marina directed by Stijn Coninx

Panorama
 Audience Award: Coming Home directed by Zhang Yimou

Premiers Rendez-vous
 Prix Premiers Rendez-vous:
 Flore Bonaventura – Chinese Puzzle (Casse-tête chinois)
 Paul Hamy – Suzanne2015 edition
The 29th edition of the festival was held from 10–14 June 2015.

Feature film
Jury: Juliette Binoche (President), Mélanie Thierry, Céline Sallette, Jérôme Bonnell, Gilles Taurand, Raphaël Personnaz, Guillaume Schiffman, Luís Galvão Teles, Maxime Nucci

 Grand Prix: Short Skin - I dolori del giovane Edo directed by Duccio Chiarini
 Special Jury Prize: Zurich directed by Sacha Polak

Swann d'Or 
 Best Film: Caprice directed by Emmanuel Mouret
 Best First Film: Blind Date (Un peu, beaucoup, aveuglément) directed by Clovis Cornillac
 Best Director: Arnaud Desplechin – My Golden Days (Trois souvenirs de ma jeunesse)
 Best Actress: Anaïs Demoustier – All About Them (À trois on y va)
 Best Actor: Benoît Magimel – Standing Tall (La Tête haute)
 Female Revelation: Joséphine Japy – Respire Male Revelation: Kévin Azaïs – Love at First Fight (Les Combattants)
 Coup de Cœur: Michel Legrand

Short film
Jury: Christophe Barratier (President), Alma Jodorowsky, Félix Moati, Marie Modiano, Finnegan Oldfield, Élisabeth Perez, Serge Riaboukine

 Best Short Film: Copain directed by Jan Roosens and Raf Roosens
 Best Actress (ex-æquo): Louisiane Gouverneur & Ilys Barillot – À qui la faute Best Actor: Benoit Hamon – Monsters Into Lovers (Jeunesse des loups-garous)

Jeunesse 
 Youth Jury Prize: Short Skin - I dolori del giovane Edo directed by Duccio Chiarini

Panorama
 Essilor Audience Award: Words and Pictures directed by Fred Schepisi

Premiers Rendez-vous
 Prix Premiers Rendez-vous:
 Sophie Verbeeck – All About Them (À trois on y va)
 Rod Paradot – Standing Tall (La Tête haute)

2016 edition
The 30th edition of the festival was held from 8–12 June 2016.

Feature film
Jury: Emmanuelle Béart (President), Loubna Abidar, Samuel Benchetrit, Joeystarr, Éric Reinhardt, Pierre Rochefort, Julia Roy, Céline Sciamma

 Grand Prix: Diamond Island directed by Davy Chou

Jeunesse 
 Youth Jury Prize: Departure directed by Andrew Steggall

Panorama
 Essilor Audience Award: A Man Called Ove directed by Hannes Holm

Short film
Jury: Pierre Schoeller (President), Marianne Basler, Frédérique Bel, Michel Feller, Jean-Baptiste Maunier, Diane Rouxel, Karidja Touré

 Best Short Film: Hotaru directed by William Laboury
 Special Mention: Gabber Lover directed by Anna Cazenave-Cambet
 Best Actress: Antonia Buresi – Que vive l'Empereur Best Actor: Jonathan Couzinié – Que vive l'EmpereurSwann d'Or 
 Best Film: Les Ogres directed by Léa Fehner
 Best Director: Bouli Lanners – The First, the Last (Les Premiers, les Derniers)
 Best Actress: Louise Bourgoin – I Am a Soldier (Je suis un soldat)
 Best Actor: Manu Payet – Dad in Training (Tout pour être heureux)
 Female Revelation: Christa Théret – The Boss's Daughter (La Fille du patron)
 Male Revelation: Kacey Mottet Klein – Being 17 (Quand on a 17 ans)
 50th Anniversary Tribute: A Man and a Woman (Un homme et une femme) directed by Claude Lelouch

Premiers Rendez-vous
 Prix Premiers Rendez-vous:
 Noémie Schmidt – The Student and Mister Henri (L'Étudiante et Monsieur Henri)
 (ex-æquo): François Nambot and Geoffrey Couët – Paris 05:59: Théo & Hugo (Théo et Hugo dans le même bateau)

2017 edition
The 31st edition of the festival was held from 14–18 June 2017.

Feature film
Jury: Marion Cotillard (President), Aure Atika, Camille Cottin, Anne Dorval, Hugo Gélin, Nathanaël Karmitz, Camille Laurens, Ibrahim Maalouf, Manu Payet

 Grand Prix: A Fantastic Woman directed by Sebastián Lelio
 Special Mention: Mobile Homes directed by Vladimir de Fontenay

Jeunesse
 Youth Jury Prize: A Fantastic Woman directed by Sebastián Lelio

Panorama
 Audience Award: BPM (Beats per Minute) directed by Robin Campillo

Short film
Jury: Gabriel Le Bomin (President), Swann Arlaud, Olivier Chantreau, Élodie Frégé, Yaniss Lespert, Solene Rigot, Salomé Richard

 Best Short Film: Journée Blanche directed by Félix de Givry
 Best Actress: Adèle Simphal – L'Attente Best Actor: (ex-æquo) Théo Cholbi and Zacharie Chasseriaud  – TropiqueSwann d'Or 
 Best Film: The Midwife (Sage Femme) directed by Martin Provost
 Best Actress: Béatrice Dalle – Chacun sa vie Best Actor: Reda Kateb – Django 
 Female Revelation: Doria Tillier – Mr. & Mrs. Adelman (Monsieur et Madame Adelman)
 Male Revelation: Rabah Nait Oufella – NocturamaPremiers Rendez-vous
 Prix Premiers Rendez-vous:
 Léna Magnien – Miss Impossible (Jamais contente)
 Soufiane Guerrab – Patients2018 edition
The 32nd edition of the festival was held from 13–17 June 2018.

Feature film
Jury: André Téchiné (President), Pascale Arbillot, Élodie Bouchez, Olga Kurylenko, Nahuel Pérez Biscayart, Raphaël,  Géraldine Nakache, Karine Silla-Perez, Justin Taurand
 Grand Prix: Ága directed by Milko Azarov

Jeunesse
 Youth Jury Prize: Treat Me Like Fire (Joueurs) directed by Marie Monge

Panorama
 Audience Award: Monsieur directed by Rohena Gera

Short film
Jury: Ophélie Bau, François Civil, Julia Faure, Johan Heldenbergh, Thierry Klifa, Alysson Paradis, Alice Vial
 Best Short Film: Bye bye les Puceaux directed by Pierre Boulanger
 Best Actress: Yafa Abu Hijleh – Bye bye les Puceaux Best Actor: Jamil McCraven – Bye bye les PuceauxSwann d'Or 
 Best Film: Mektoub, My Love: Canto Uno directed by Abdellatif Kechiche
 Best Actress: Clémence Boisnard – La Fête est finie Best Actor: Anthony Bajon – The Prayer (La Prière)
 Female Revelation: Mélanie Thierry – Memoir of War (La douleur)
 Male Revelation: (ex-æquo) Pierre Deladonchamps and Vincent Lacoste – Sorry Angel (Plaire, aimer et courir vite)

Premiers Rendez-vous
 Prix Premiers Rendez-vous:
 Laëtitia Clément – Luna Shaïn Boumedine – Mektoub, My Love: Canto Uno2019 edition
The 33rd edition of the festival was held from 12–16 June 2019.

Feature film
Jury: Sandrine Bonnaire (President), Naidra Ayadi, Eric Demarsan, Lætitia Dosch, Lou de Laâge, Oury Milshtein, Vincent Perez, Alice Pol, Danièle Thompson
 Grand Prix: Too Late to Die Young (Tarde Para Morir Joven) directed by Dominga Sotomayor

Jeunesse
 Youth Jury Prize: Aurora directed by Miia Tervo
 Special Mention: Manta Ray directed by Phuttiphong Aroonpheng

Panorama
 Audience Award: Yesterday directed by Danny Boyle

Short film
Jury: Rebecca Zlotowski (President), Noée Abita, Santiago Amigorena, Shaïn Boumedine, Rahmatou Keïta, Jules Benchetrit, Lola Le Lann
 Best Short Film: Sous l'écorce directed by Ève-Chems de Brouwer
 Special Mention: Elle s'appelait Baby directed by Mélanie Laleu et Baptiste Gourden
 Best Actress: Zoé Heran – Max Best Actor: Paul Nouhet – Les Méduses de GouvilleSwann d'Or 
 Best Film: Love at Second Sight directed by Hugo Gélin
 Best Actress: Juliette Binoche – Who You Think I Am (Celle que vous croyez)
 Best Actor: Bouli Lanners – C’est ça l’amour Female Revelation: Nora Hamzawi – Non-Fiction (Doubles vies)
 Male Revelation: Karim Leklou – The World Is Yours (Le Monde est à toi)

Premiers Rendez-vous
 Prix Premiers Rendez-vous:
 (ex-æquo) Sarah Henochsberg and Justine Lacroix – C’est ça l’amour Tom Mercier – Synonymes''

See also

 Film festivals in France

References

External links

 
 

Film festivals in France
Film festivals established in 1983
1983 establishments in France
Calvados (department)
Tourist attractions in Calvados (department)
June events